Big Susan is a 1947 children's fantasy story written and illustrated by Elizabeth Orton Jones. It is generally considered a Christmas story, reflecting the author's love of the holiday season. (She was born on June 25, or, according to her, half past Christmas.)

The plot deals with the Doll family, a family of dolls that belong to Susan, or Big Susan as they call her, for she is more than double their size. One night a year (Christmas) they come to life, and a fantastical story of Christmas miracles begins.

The novel, along with Twig, is one of Jones' most popular books. It was out of print for a few years, until the recent 55th anniversary edition came out, in 2002.

1st edition
Purple House Press; 1st edition (September 2002), 

1947 children's books
Christmas children's books
American picture books
Sentient toys in fiction
Dolls in fiction
Macmillan Publishers books